Zurab Marshan was Minister for Health of Abkhazia from 25 February 2005 until 15 October 2014, in the Governments of President Bagapsh and President Ankvab. Marshan was first appointed after the election of Sergei Bagapsh in 2005. He was re-appointed on 28 October 2011 by Alexander Ankvab following Bagapsh's death. He was not re-appointed by Raul Khajimba after his election in 2014.

References

Ministers for Health of Abkhazia
Living people
Year of birth missing (living people)